ADU or Adu may refer to:

Universities 
 Abu Dhabi University 
 Adamson University of Manila
 Afghan Defense University, now called Marshal Fahim National Defense University
 ArsDigita University at MIT
 Animal Demography Unit, University of Cape Town

Other uses
 Accessory dwelling unit or secondary suite
 Adu (surname)
 Adú, 2020 Spanish film
 Ammonium diuranate
 Analog-to-digital converter or Analog-to-digital unit
 Application discovery and understanding
 Ardabil Airport, Iran